The 1932 Summer Olympics, referred to by the International Olympic Committee as the Games of the X Olympiad, were held in Los Angeles, California, United States, from July 30 through August 14, 1932.

A total of individual athletes won medals. Athletes from the United States were the most successful, winning 103 medals during the games, 41 of which were gold. Italy and Finland, won the second and third most medals, with 36 and 25 respectively. France finished third in the gold medal count (behind Italy and the United States) having achieved 10 golds in their haul of 19 medals.

Medals were awarded in a total of 116 events across 16 sports. In addition, American football and lacrosse were held as demonstration events.

Athletics

Boxing

Cycling

Diving

Men

Women

Equestrian

Note:The scheduled team jumping event was declared void as no nation completed the course with three riders

Fencing

Field hockey

Gymnastics

Modern pentathlon

Rowing

Sailing

Shooting

Swimming

Men

Women

Water polo

Weightlifting

Wrestling

Greco-Roman

Freestyle

Statistics

Medal leaders
Athletes who won multiple medals during the 1932 Winter Olympics are listed below.

See also
1932 Summer Olympics medal table

External links

Medal winners
1932